Saara asmussi, also known commonly as the Iranian mastigure and the Persian spiny-tailed lizard, is a species of lizard belonging to the family Agamidae. The species is endemic to Asia.

Etymology
The specific name, asmussi, is in honor of Baltic German paleozoologist Hermann Martin Asmuss.

Geographic range
S. asmussi occurs in Afghanistan, southern Iran, and Pakistan.

Description

Diet
S. asmussi eats leaves, stems, and seeds of herbaceous plants.

Behavior
S. asmussi excavates a burrow in which it shelters. If disturbed it lashes its heavy spiky tail in defense.

Reproduction
S. asmussi is oviparous.

References

Further reading
Boulenger GA (1885). Catalogue of the Lizards in the British Museum (Natural History). Second Edition. Volume I. ... Agamidæ. London: Trustees of the British Museum (Natural History). (Taylor and Francis, printers). xii + 436 pp. + Plates I–XXXII. (Uromastix asmussii, new combination, p. 409).
Sindaco R, Jeremčenko VK (2008). The Reptiles of the Western Palearctic. 1. Annotated Checklist and Distributional Atlas of the Turtles, Crocodiles, Amphisbaenians and Lizards of Europe, North Africa, Middle East and Central Asia. (Monographs of the Societas Herpetologica Italica). Latina, Italy: Edizioni Belvedere. 580 pp. .
Strauch A (1863). "Characteristik zweier neuen Eidechsen aus Persien [= Characteristics of Two New Lizards from Persia]". Bulletin de l'Académie Impériale des Sciences de Saint-Pétersbourg 6: 477–480. (Centrotrachelus asmussi, new species, pp. 479–480). (in German).

Saara (lizard)
Reptiles of Afghanistan
Reptiles of Iran
Reptiles of Pakistan
Reptiles described in 1863
Taxa named by Alexander Strauch